Rabbi Chaim Flom (July 6, 1951 - May 19, 2008) was a rabbi, scholar and Rosh Yeshiva of Yeshivat Ohr David in Jerusalem, Israel.  He studied at Yeshivas Rabbeinu Yisrael Meir HaKohen. originally from Pittsburgh Pennsylvania.

He founded Yeshivat Ohr David in 1980 with fellow Rosh Yeshivah, Rabbi Yosef Granofsky. He served in the Israeli Defense Force.

External links
 Death Notice "Rav Chaim Flom ZATZAL, Rosh Yeshivas Or Dovid"
htt

ps://mishpacha.com/in-the-drivers-seat/

2008 deaths
20th-century rabbis in Jerusalem
Israeli Rosh yeshivas
1951 births